Parliamentary elections were held in Estonia alongside presidential elections on 20 September 1992, the first after regaining independence from the Soviet Union. The newly elected 101 members of the 7th Riigikogu assembled at Toompea Castle in Tallinn within ten days of the election. Following the elections, the five-party Fatherland Bloc led by Mart Laar formed a government together with national-conservative Estonian National Independence Party and centrist Moderates alliance. Voter turnout was 68%.

Campaign
Several alliances were formed prior to the elections:

Conduct
Several issues were recorded during the elections; numerous people voted in a booth at the same time while other voters failed to keep their votes secret, causing inconsistencies. Officials also failed to standardize in voting materials and ballot-counting. The existence of a preliminary two-week voting period also led to concerns about ballot security among officials.

The most difficult aspect of the elections was the matter of citizenship and who was eligible to vote. In order to be considered a citizen, people had to prove that they, their parents, or their grandparents were citizens of the pre-World War II Republic of Estonia. This was extremely difficult, as many families had no documentation of their citizenship. Non-citizens had to have lived in Estonia for two years, passed a test, and waited another year in order to be considered for citizenship. This made voting nearly impossible for some individuals. Outside the capital, officials determined who or who was not a citizen in a process that took 10–15 minutes, but in Tallinn, the process was more extensive as the necessary officials were not near the voting booths. This led to embarrassment on behalf of the officials and frustration by the voters, many of whom never cast their vote because of the hassle of proving citizenship.

Despite these issues, the elections were largely conducted smoothly and cooperatively. There were concerns about the Russian minority within Estonia as tensions were high due to new definitions of citizenship, but confrontation was avoided. Ambassadors representing the Russian minority gave statements and held interviews to assure the public that they were open to communication and wished to arrive at a mutually beneficial solution.

Results
Parties like the Popular Front of Estonia and the Estonian National Independence Party had achieved great success during the Singing Revolution and attempted to capitalize on this success during the elections. The well-established parties fared poorly, as they were unable to adapt and appeared conservative compared to new parties such as the Estonian Citizen and Fatherland Bloc. Following the elections, the Popular Front disbanded.

The frivolous Independent Royalist Party of Estonia surprisingly gained eight seats in the new parliament; a satirical party that campaigned under the intention to establish Estonia as a monarchy, they spent one kroon on their election campaign.

References

External links
Election results Estonian Electoral Commission

Parliamentary elections in Estonia
Estonia
1992 in Estonia